The Time Has Come to Shoot You Down... What a Sound is a covers album by the Flaming Lips and friends. It is a reworking of the Stone Roses' self-titled album. Produced by the Flaming Lips, it was released on November 29, 2013 as part of the year's releases for Black Friday.

The track listing follows that of the original 1989 UK release of The Stone Roses, finishing with "Fools Gold" (frequently added as an album closer on re-releases of The Stone Roses).

Track listing
All songs written by Ian Brown and John Squire.
 "I Wanna Be Adored"
 "She Bangs the Drums"
 "Waterfall"
 "Don't Stop"
 "Bye Bye Badman"
 "Elizabeth My Dear"
 "Song for My Sugar Spun Sister"
 "Made of Stone"
 "Shoot You Down"
 "This Is the One"
 "Resurrection"
 "Fools Gold"

References

2013 albums
Covers albums
The Flaming Lips albums
The Stone Roses